In probability theory, an additive Markov chain is a Markov chain with an additive conditional probability function. Here the process is a discrete-time Markov chain of order m and the transition probability to a state at the next time is a sum of functions, each depending on the next state and one of the m previous states.

Definition
An additive Markov chain of order m is a sequence of random variables X1, X2, X3, ..., possessing the following property: the probability that a random variable Xn has a certain value xn under the condition that the values of all previous variables are fixed depends on the values of m previous variables only (Markov chain of order m), and the influence of previous variables on a generated one is additive,

Binary case
A binary additive Markov chain is where the state space of the chain consists on two values only, Xn ∈ { x1, x2 }. For example, Xn ∈ { 0, 1 }. The conditional probability function of a binary additive Markov chain can be represented as

 

 

Here  is the probability to find Xn = 1 in the sequence and
F(r) is referred to as the memory function.

Relation between the memory function and the correlation function
It is defined as follows:

where the symbol  denotes averaging over all n. By definition,

There is a relation between the memory function and the correlation function of the binary additive Markov chain:

See also
 Examples of Markov chains

Notes

References
 A.A. Markov. (1906) "Rasprostranenie zakona bol'shih chisel na velichiny, zavisyaschie drug ot druga". Izvestiya Fiziko-matematicheskogo obschestva pri Kazanskom universitete, 2-ya seriya, tom 15, 135–156
 A.A. Markov. (1971) "Extension of the limit theorems of probability theory to a sum of variables connected in a chain". reprinted in Appendix B of: R. Howard. Dynamic Probabilistic Systems, volume 1: Markov Chains. John Wiley and Sons
 
 
Ramakrishnan, S. (1981) "Finitely Additive Markov Chains", Transactions of the American Mathematical Society, 265 (1), 247–272 

Markov processes